Tin sulfide can refer to either of these chemical compounds:

Tin(II) sulfide, SnS
Tin(IV) sulfide, SnS2